The discography of Ayub Ogada, a Kenyan singer-songwriter.

Albums

Singles

Promotional singles

References

Discographies of Kenyan artists